Andrzej Lesiak (born 21 May 1966 in Nowogród Bobrzański) is a Polish football coach and a former player.

References

1966 births
Living people
People from Zielona Góra County
Sportspeople from Lubusz Voivodeship
Polish footballers
Association football defenders
Poland international footballers
Bundesliga players
GKS Katowice players
FC Wacker Innsbruck players
Dynamo Dresden players
SV Ried players
SK Rapid Wien players
FC Red Bull Salzburg players
Austrian Football Bundesliga players
Polish football managers
SV Ried managers
TSV Hartberg managers
FC Tirol Innsbruck players
Polish expatriate footballers
Polish expatriate football managers
Expatriate footballers in Austria
Expatriate footballers in Germany
Polish expatriate sportspeople in Germany
Polish expatriate sportspeople in Austria
Expatriate football managers in Austria